Eurukuttarus rotunda is a moth of the family Psychidae first described by George Hampson. It is found in India and Sri Lanka.

References

Moths of Asia
Psychidae